Frida Nordin (born 23 May 1982) is a Swedish football midfielder who played for IF Limhamn Bunkeflo in the Elitettan. She first played in the UEFA Women's Cup in 2004.

Since 2001 Nordin has been a member of the Swedish national team. She was included in the silver medal-winning 2003 World Cup squad, while she missed the 2007 World Cup due to an injury.

In May 2013 Nordin returned to action for Malmö after a year out with an anterior cruciate ligament injury, but just two months later she departed for another Malmö-based club, Limhamn Bunkeflo.

References

External links
Profile at the Swedish Football Association
Stats
 

1982 births
Living people
Swedish women's footballers
FC Rosengård players
Damallsvenskan players
Sweden women's international footballers
Women's association football defenders
2003 FIFA Women's World Cup players
People from Växjö
Sportspeople from Kronoberg County